The Mauranger Power Station  is a hydroelectric power station located in Kvinnherad, Vestland, Norway.

See also

References 

Kvinnherad
Hydroelectric power stations in Norway
Buildings and structures in Vestland